The insular myotis (Myotis insularum) is one of over 100 of species of vesper bat in the genus Myotis. It is found in possibly American Samoa and possibly Samoa.

References

Mouse-eared bats
Bats of Oceania
Mammals of American Samoa
Mammals of Samoa
Mammals described in 1878
Taxonomy articles created by Polbot
Taxa named by George Edward Dobson